Kasai Allstars are a 25-piece musical collective based in Kinshasa, Democratic Republic of the Congo. The musicians originally come from the Kasai region, but originating from five different ethnic groups: the Songye, Lulua, Tetela, Luba, and Luntu. Some of these groups have endured conflicting relationships over the centuries, and they each have their own culture, their own language, and their own musical traditions. These were always thought to be incompatible until the musicians decided to pool their resources and form a collective at the instigation of Belgian producer Vincent Kenis.

Career
In 2008, Kasai Allstars released an album on Crammed Discs entitled In the 7th Moon, the Chief Turned Into a Swimming Fish and Ate the Head of His Enemy by Magic. It was the third release in the label's Congotronics series. The album was well received by Western music critics.

In 2010, Crammed Discs released Tradi-Mods vs. Rockers: Alternative Takes on Congotronics, a multi-artist album containing  interpretations, covers and tributes to the music of Kasai Allstars, Konono Nº1 and other Congotronics bands, recorded by 26 indie rock and electronic musicians, including Deerhoof, Animal Collective, Andrew Bird, Juana Molina, Shackleton, Megafaun, and Aksak Maboul. The following year, Kasai Allstars took part in the Congotronics vs. Rockers project, a "superband" of ten Congolese and ten indie rock musicians (including members of Deerhoof, Wildbirds & Peacedrums, Konono No.1, Skeletons, and Juana Molina), who collaborated to create a common repertoire and performed at 15 major festivals and venues in ten countries.

Kasai Allstars' second full-length album, Beware the Fetish, was released in 2014. The album was well welcomed by the press. In 2017, Kasai Allstars appeared in Alain Gomis' film Félicité, for which they wrote and recorded most of the soundtrack music. The soundtrack album was entitled Around Félicité. The album Black Ants Always Fly Together, One Bangle Makes No Sound was released in May 2021.

Band line-up 
(as it appears on the album In The 7th Moon...):
 Mputu Ebondo 'Mi Amor': lead vocals
 Muambuyi: lead vocals, dancer
 Mbuyamba Nyunyi: lead vocals, bass likembe
 Kabongo Tshisensa: lead vocals, likembe, bass likembe
 Tandjolo: lokole (slit drum), lead vocals
 Tshilumba Muamba 'Baila' and Didi Bafuafua: xylophones
 Tshimanga Muamba: resonator drum
 Kalenga Ditu: likembe (thumb piano)
 Mopero and Niawu: electric guitars
 Kabese Ngandu 'Bondis': vocals, percussion
 Ngalula Ndaye Sylvie, Bosio Tokala Mamie, Yempongo Kadiya,
 Tete Mutungilayi and Kanku Nshinga Wa Buanda: vocals and dancing
 Mpanya Mutombo: lead vocals
 Gaby Nsapo Kilolo: guitar and vocals

Discography 
 In the 7th Moon, the Chief Turned Into a Swimming Fish and Ate the Head of His Enemy by Magic (2008, Crammed Discs)
 The Congotronics Vinyl Box Set (2010).
 Beware the Fetish (2014, Crammed Discs)
Around Félicité (2017, Crammed Discs)
 Black Ants Always Fly Together, One Bangle Makes No Sound (2021, Crammed Discs)

Compilation appearances
 Congotronics 2: multi-artist album, including tracks and videos by Kasai Allstars, by its sub-groups Basokin and Masanka Sankayi, by Konono N°1, Bolia We Ndenge, Sobanza Mimanisa, Kisanzi Congo and Tulu. (2005, Crammed Discs).
 Tshileja: original track included in the compilation 20 Ways To Float Through Walls (2007, Crammed Discs).
 Tradi-Mods Vs. Rockers: Alternative Takes on Congotronics (2010, Crammed Discs), a double CD featuring reworks and reinterpretations of the music of Kasai Allstars, Konono No 1 and other Congolese bands, made by 24 indie rock and electronic musicians from Europe, Japan and the Americas.

References

External links
 Kasai Allstars pages on the Crammed Discs site
  Mpofu video
 Vidéo Wa Muluendu video

Democratic Republic of the Congo musical groups
Culture of Kinshasa